Group A of the 2007 Fed Cup Europe/Africa Zone Group II was one of two pools in the Europe/Africa Zone Group II of the 2007 Fed Cup. Three teams competed in a round robin competition, with the top team and the bottom two teams proceeding to their respective sections of the play-offs: the top teams played for advancement to Group I, while the bottom team faced potential relegation to Group III.

South Africa vs. Finland

South Africa vs. Greece

Finland vs. Greece

See also
Fed Cup structure

References

External links
 Fed Cup website

2007 Fed Cup Europe/Africa Zone